Jaime Melo, also known as Jaime Melo Jr. (born 24 April 1980), is a Brazilian professional racing driver best known for his success in grand tourers as Ferrari driver. In 2006, he won the FIA GT Championship in the GT2 class driving for AF Corse, and the next year, he did the same at the American Le Mans Series for Risi Competizione, where he currently drives. Melo has collected GT2 class wins at the 2008 and 2009 24 Hours of Le Mans; the 2009 24 Hours of Spa; the 2007, 2009, and 2010 12 Hours of Sebring; and the 2008 and 2009 Petit Le Mans, among other endurance race wins.

For 2012, Melo competed in the FIA World Endurance Championship, driving for Luxury Racing in GTE-Pro.

24 Hours of Le Mans results

Complete International Formula 3000 results
(key)

Complete Euro Formula 3000 results
(key) (Races in bold indicate pole position; races in italics indicate fastest lap)

External links 
 

1980 births
Living people
Brazilian racing drivers
FIA GT Championship drivers
Formula Renault V6 Eurocup drivers
Auto GP drivers
Formula 3 Sudamericana drivers
American Le Mans Series drivers
International Formula 3000 drivers
24 Hours of Le Mans drivers
European Le Mans Series drivers
People from Cascavel
FIA World Endurance Championship drivers
Stock Car Brasil drivers
24 Hours of Spa drivers
Sportspeople from Paraná (state)

Victory Engineering drivers
Cram Competition drivers
Durango drivers
Euronova Racing drivers
AF Corse drivers
Nürburgring 24 Hours drivers